Methodist Central College is a provincial school in Batticaloa, Sri Lanka.

History 
Methodist Central College was established in 1814 by Rev. William Ault, one of the Wesleyan Methodist missionaries to Ceylon. The missionaries sailed to Ceylon from Portsmouth, England on 30 December 1813, landing in Ceylon on 29 June 1814. Methodist Central College was the first educational institution in Batticaloa.

In the early years, according to Shirley Somanader, "the Boys’ school was held on the verandah facing College House (presently the Puliyantivu Methodist Minister’s Manse)". Somander also wrote, "In 1859, the new school was completed at a cost of 350 British Pounds."

At the bicentennial of the College in 2014, according to the school's alumni association,  "In recognising and commemorating this historic event, the Government of Sri Lanka has approved the release of a new stamp this year. Since the inception of this college in 1814, its profound achievements in the arenas of culture, education and religion have kept on flourishing on the island."

See also
 List of schools in Eastern Province, Sri Lanka

References

External links 

  (video, 5:33 minutes)

Former Methodist schools in Sri Lanka
Provincial schools in Sri Lanka
Schools in Batticaloa